"Vamos a Marte" is a song by German singer Helene Fischer featuring Puerto Rican singer Luis Fonsi. It was released on 6 August 2021, as the lead single from her ninth studio album Rausch. The track was written by Fischer and Fonsi, as well as German singer-songwriters Nico Santos and Chris Cronauer, among others, while production was handled by Beatzarre, Djorkaeff, B-Case and Fischer. The song was a top-ten hit in German-speaking countries, including reaching no. 2 in Germany.

Background
Fischer and Fonsi had previously performed together at the Echo Music Prize in 2018. Fischer released the song after having taken a one-year hiatus from the public. She announced the single on her social media on 23 July 2021. The song was released as a celebration of Fischer's 37th birthday on 4 August. About the song, the singer revealed in a clip that she had been waiting a long time to release the song and that there could be no better birthday gift. Fonsi expressed that he felt honoured to have recorded the song with Fischer and that he had never recorded a song in German and Spanish before. The Song reached number 165 in the US Top 200 Single Charts.

Composition
A pop song with notable electronic, Latin and Schlager elements, Fischer and Fonsi take turns at singing in German and Spanish. Lyrically, the song sees the singers trading lines about not having to speak the same language in order to understand each other.

Music video
The music video was released on 6 August 2021. It shows Fischer performing at a space station, while Fonsi is seen partying at a bar. Throughout the video, Fischer is seen dancing in alternating outfits, including a glitter crop top and leather leggins. The video accumulated more than 500,000 views on YouTube in its first 24 hours.

Track listing

Personnel
Credits adapted from Tidal.

 Helene Fischer – songwriting, vocals, production
 Luis Fonsi – songwriting, vocals, recording engineering
 Chris Cronauer – songwriting, background vocals, production, guitar, keyboards, programming
 Daniel Cronauer – songwriting
 Eduardo Ruiz – songwriting
 José Cano Carrilero – songwriting
 Juan Carlos Arauzo – songwriting
 Konstantin Scherer – songwriting, production, programming
 Matthias Zürkler – songwriting, production, bass, drums, keyboards, programming
 Nico Santos – songwriting
 Robin Haefs – songwriting
 Vincent Stein – songwriting, production, programming, mixing
 Laura Morina – mastering engineering
 Sascha Büren – mastering engineering
 Madizin – recording engineering
 Silver Jam – recording engineering

Charts

Weekly charts

Year-end charts

Certifications

References

2021 singles
2021 songs
German-language songs
Helene Fischer songs
Polydor Records singles
Schlager songs